Hitesh Hira (born 24 June 1971) is a Zimbabwean cricketer. He played nine first-class matches for Mashonaland between 1992/1993 and 1994/95.

See also
 List of Mashonaland first-class cricketers

References

External links
 

1971 births
Living people
Zimbabwean cricketers
Mashonaland cricketers
Sportspeople from Harare